The San Francisco Concert is a live album by flautist Hubert Laws recorded at the Paramount Theatre in California in 1975 and released in 1977 on the CTI label.

Reception
The Allmusic review by Scott Yanow awarded the album 3 stars stating "This live set finds flutist Hubert Laws both looking backwards toward his best CTI recordings and ahead to his generally abysmal output for Columbia... Backed by a huge string orchestra, Laws plays quite well, uplifting the material and doing what he can with the charts".

Track listing
 "Modadji" (Dave Grusin) - 12:09 
 "Feel Like Making Love" (Eugene McDaniels) - 6:16 
 "Farandole" (Georges Bizet) - 10:55 
 "Scheherazade" (Nikolai Rimsky-Korsakov) - 8:18

Personnel
Hubert Laws - flute 
Bob James - electric piano, arranger, conductor
Glen Deardorff - guitar
Gary King - bass
Harvey Mason - drums
Nathan Rubin, Virginia Baker, Myra Bucky, Anne Crowden, Ardeen De Camp, Beth Gibson; Alexander Horvath, Daniel Kobialka, Donna Lerew, Greg Mazmanian, Zaven Melikian, Carl Pedersen, Ruggiero Pelosi, Judith Poska, Frances Schorr, Verne Sellin - violin
Arthur Bauch, Hope Bauch, Don Ehrlich, Nancy Ellis, Thomas Heimberg, Albert White - viola
Terry Adams, Joel Cohen, Richard Eade, Mary Anne Meredith, Margaret Moores, Amy Radner - cello
Michelle Burr, Jeffrey Neighbor - string bass
Randall Pratt - harp
Stuart Gronningen, Jeremy Merrill - French horn 
Frederick Berry, Oscar Brashear, Allen Smith, Snooky Young - trumpet
George Bohanon, Daniel Livesay - trombone
Maurice Spears - bass trombone

References

1977 albums
CTI Records live albums
Hubert Laws albums
Albums produced by Creed Taylor
Music of the San Francisco Bay Area